Citra Sentul Raya is a township development at Sentul, Indonesia. The project is being developed by a joint operation between Ciputra Residence with PT Tridaya Semesta and PT Sarana Golf Utama.

Transportation
Citra Sentul Raya can be accessed by Jagorawi toll road from Jakarta and Bogor. It will also have a station of Greater Jakarta LRT which is now under-construction.

See also 

Babakan Madang

External links

References 

Populated places in West Java
Planned townships in Indonesia